Chen Jing may refer to:

Chen Jing (table tennis) (born 1968), Chinese/Taiwanese table tennis player
Chen Jing (ice hockey) (born 1971), Chinese ice hockey player
Chen Jing (volleyball) (born 1975), Chinese volleyball player
Chen Jing (athlete) (born 1976), Chinese Olympic athlete

See also
Chen Jin (disambiguation)